Mortimer Mendel "Mendy" Morein (22 May 1926 – 1 April 2003) was a Canadian basketball player. He competed in the men's tournament at the 1948 Summer Olympics.

References

1926 births
2003 deaths
Canadian men's basketball players
Olympic basketball players of Canada
Basketball players at the 1948 Summer Olympics
Basketball players from Montreal